The  Sacramento Attack season was the first season for the Arena football franchise, and its only season in Sacramento, California. The Attack finished 4–6 and lost in the playoffs to the Detroit Drive. The franchise was originally going to be located in Los Angeles, California and be called the Los Angeles Wings, but the franchise never came into existence in Los Angeles, and moved to Sacramento as the Attack.

Regular season

Schedule

Standings

z – clinched homefield advantage

y – clinched division title

x – clinched playoff spot

Playoffs

Roster

Awards

References

External links
1992 Sacramento Attack on ArenaFan.com

Sacramento Attack
American football teams in Sacramento, California
Sacramento Attack
Florida Bobcats seasons